Ras Related Glycolysis Inhibitor and Calcium Channel Regulator (RRAD) is a protein that in humans is encoded by the RRAD gene. RRAD is a Ras-related small GTPase that is regulated by p53 and plays a role in the regulation of aerobic glycolysis.

Interactions 

RRAD has been shown to interact with CAMK2G and TPM2.

References

Further reading

External links